The second season of The Unit originally aired between September 19, 2006 and May 8, 2007; it introduces several new characters to the series. Tiffy has trouble with the law when she covers for Colonel Ryan's wife, Charlotte, and The Unit is investigated by the CIA over infractions that could result in criminal charges.

Cast and characters

Main cast 
 Dennis Haysbert as Sergeant Major Jonas Blane, aka Snake Doctor
 Scott Foley as Staff Sergeant Bob Brown, aka Cool Breeze
 Max Martini as Master Sergeant Mack Gerhardt, aka Dirt Diver
 Michael Irby as Sergeant First Class Charles Grey, aka Betty Blue
 Robert Patrick as Colonel Thomas Ryan, aka Dog Patch
 Demore Barnes as Sergeant First Class Hector Williams, aka Hammerhead

Supporting cast 
 Regina Taylor as Molly Blane
 Audrey Marie Anderson as Kim Brown
 Abby Brammell as Tiffy Gerhardt
 Rebecca Pidgeon as Charlotte Ryan
 Kavita Patil as Sergeant Kayla Medawar

Recurring cast 
 Susan Matus as Sergeant Sarah Irvine
 Angel Wainwright as Betsy Blane
 Summer Glau as Crystal Burns
 Daniel Wisler as Jeremy Erhart
 Alyssa Shafer as Serena Brown
 Jon Hamm as Wilson James
 Lindsay Frost as US Senator Elizabeth Webb
 Ricky Jay as CIA Agent Kern
 Conor O'Farrell as General Heath

Episodes

Notes

References

External links 
 
 

2006 American television seasons
2007 American television seasons
The Unit seasons